
El Encanto Lake is a seasonal lake in the Beni Department, Bolivia and Aguapeí, Vila Bela da Santíssima Trindade, State of Mato Grosso, Brazil. At an elevation of 170 m, its surface area is 4.5 km².

References 

Lakes of Beni Department
Lakes of Brazil